Robert William Michael Palmer (born 4 June 1960) is a Hong Kong born former English cricketer.  Palmer was a right-handed batsman who bowled left-arm medium pace.

Palmer made his first-class debut for Cambridge University against Worcestershire in 1981.  Palmer played 10 further first-class matches for the university, the last coming against Northamptonshire.  In his 11 first-class matches, he took 16 runs at a bowling average of 59.62, with best figures of 4/96.

He played Minor Counties Championship and MCCA Knockout Trophy matches for Buckinghamshire in 1986.

References

External links
Robert Palmer at ESPNcricinfo
Robert Palmer at CricketArchive

1960 births
Living people
Hong Kong cricketers
English cricketers
Cambridge University cricketers
Buckinghamshire cricketers